Diane Thorne (born 1943 or 1944) is a former provincial representative of Coquitlam-Maillardville in the Legislative Assembly of British Columbia, Canada. She was originally elected in 2005 and re-elected in 2009. She was the deputy opposition critic for Education.
 She is a member of the New Democratic Party of British Columbia.

References

Year of birth missing (living people)
Living people
British Columbia New Democratic Party MLAs
Women MLAs in British Columbia
People from Coquitlam
21st-century Canadian politicians
21st-century Canadian women politicians